These quarterbacks have started at least one game for the Philadelphia Eagles of the National Football League. They are listed in order of the date of each player's first start as the quarterback for the Eagles.

Regular season

The number of games they started during the season is listed to the right:

Notes:

 Due to the 1982 Players' strike, only nine games were played in the 1982 season.

Postseason

Team career passing records
Through the 2022 NFL regular season

Team Career Win / Loss Record 
Through the 2022 NFL Regular Season

See also
 Lists of NFL starting quarterbacks

External links
 Pro-Football Reference

Philadelphia Eagles

quarterbacks